The stargazing darter (Percina uranidea) is a species of freshwater ray-finned fish, a darter from the subfamily Etheostomatinae, part of the family Percidae, which also contains the perches, ruffes and pikeperches. It is endemic to the United States.

Geographic distribution
Found in the St. Francis, White and Ouachita River drainages in Missouri, Arkansas and Louisiana; formerly in lower the Wabash River in Indiana and Illinois.

References

Freshwater fish of the United States
Percina
Fish described in 1887
Taxa named by David Starr Jordan
Taxonomy articles created by Polbot